Sutera Harbour is a resort located in the city of Kota Kinabalu, Sabah, Malaysia. It comprised two 5-star hotels, a 27-hole Graham Marsh-designed golf course, a 104-berth marina and an exclusive golf and country club with extensive recreational facilities facing the South China Sea with a background of Tunku Abdul Rahman National Park. In 2014, Singapore-based GSH Corporation has acquired the resort.

There are 956 rooms in total by combining the two 5-star hotel together, which make it the largest resort in Kota Kinabalu as well as Borneo.

References 

Buildings and structures in Kota Kinabalu